The Senate Majority and Minority Leaders (also called Senate Floor Leaders) are the two Senators of the Philippines who are elected by their respective parties or coalitions as their official leaders. They serve as the chief spokesmen of their party with regard to their business in the Senate.

Current floor leaders
The current majority floor leader is Joel Villanueva, an independent. The current minority leader is Koko Pimentel of the PDP–Laban

History
The positions of Majority leader and Minority leader of the Senate of the Philippines are similar to the United States Senate's party leaders.

When the Philippines was a Commonwealth of the United States during the 1930s, it followed the American style of legislature. Then, upon the adoption of the 1935 Constitution, the Philippine government eventually patterned its bicameral Congress on the United States Congress.

But on June 12, 1978, when the Interim Batasang Pambansa was inaugurated as mandated by the 1973 Constitution, as the country shifted from a presidential to a parliamentary form of government, it automatically abolished the two houses of Congress. The offices of the Senate majority and minority leaders were also automatically abolished.

On July 27, 1987, five months after the EDSA Revolution that toppled the Marcos administration, the Congress resumed its session 15 years after its abolition. All offices and positions of the Senate were restored upon the resumption of the 8th Congress of the Philippines.

The first Majority leader of the Senate after its restoration was Orlando S. Mercado, while the first Minority leader of the Senate was Juan Ponce Enrile.

On July 26, 2004, Francis Pangilinan was re-elected by his party to serve as their Majority leader after he served a short term when then Senator Loren Legarda left the majority and allied with the opposition to run for Vice President against then Senator Noli De Castro in the 2004 national elections.

Majority leader of the Senate

In the modern Senate, the second in command is the Majority leader. His primary responsibility is to manage the legislative affairs and the business for the part of the majority in the chamber.

He is chosen by the majority party in the Senate to serve as their official leader in the body.

While nothing in the Rules of the Senate expressly states the powers of the Majority leader, to a great extent, he is very influential in the passage of bills.

As the traditional Chairman of the Committee on Rules, the Majority leader helps formulate, promote, negotiate and defend the majority's legislative program, particularly on the floor. By tradition also, the Senate President or any Presiding Officer gives the Majority leader priority in obtaining the floor.

He also helps in developing the calendar of the Senate and assist the Senate President with program development & policy formation and decisions.

He also has the power to exercise party discipline in consultation with other senior party leaders, with regards of voting on party policies and programs deemed to be crucial. If ever, a member of his party doesn't vote for the party's proposed measures, he can demote him/her from committee assignments leading to a reshuffle on some of the Senate committees.

Minority leader of the Senate

The minority group chooses from among themselves the Minority leader who is considered as the titular head of the minority in the Senate and often called the "shadow president".

In many past rigodons of the Senate or the so-called Senate "coups", sometimes the Minority leader becomes the President and the ousted President becomes the minority leader.

The basic duties of the Minority leader is that he becomes the spokesman for his party or group or coalition and enunciates its policies. He is expected to be alert and vigilant in defense of the minority's rights. It is his function and duty to criticize constructively the policies and programs of the majority, and to this end employ parliamentary tactics and give close attention to all proposed legislation.

The Rules of the Senate give the President pro tempore and the Majority and Minority Leaders unique privileges as all are ex-officio members of all the permanent committees of the Senate.

List

See also 

 Floor leaders of the House of Representatives of the Philippines

References

Sources
 Officers of the Philippine Senate
 List of Senators

External links
 Senate of the Philippines

Majority leaders of the Senate of the Philippines
Minority leaders of the Senate of the Philippines
Political office-holders in the Philippines